Billy the Kid Returns  is a 1938 American Western film directed by Joseph Kane and starring Roy Rogers.

Plot

Following the shooting of Billy the Kid by his former friend Sheriff Pat Garrett, lookalike deputy sheriff Roy Rogers, assisted by travelling musical instrument salesman Frog Millhouse, takes his place to defend the honest settlers of Lincoln County, New Mexico, from evil ranchers.

Cast
Roy Rogers as Roy Rogers / Billy the Kid
Smiley Burnette as Frog Millhouse
Lynne Roberts as Ellen Moore
Morgan Wallace as J. B. Morganson
Fred Kohler as Matson
Wade Boteler as Sheriff Pat Garrett
Edwin Stanley as Nathaniel Moore
Horace Murphy as Mr. Miller - Homesteader
Joseph Crehan as U.S. Marshal Dave Conway
Robert Emmett Keane as Mr. Page

Soundtrack
 Roy Rogers – "Born to the Saddle" (Written by Eddie Cherkose)
 Roy Rogers – "Trail Blazin'" (Written by Eddie Cherkose)
 Roy Rogers – "Save a Smile for a Rainy Day" (Written by Sid Robin and Foy Willing)
 Smiley Burnette – "Sing a Little Song About Anything" (Written by Smiley Burnette)
 Roy Rogers – "When I Camped Under the Stars" (Written by Tim Spencer)
 Roy Rogers – "When the Sun is Setting on the Prairie" (Written by Eddie Cherkose and Alberto Colombo)

External links

1938 films
1938 Western (genre) films
Biographical films about Billy the Kid
Republic Pictures films
American black-and-white films
American Western (genre) films
Films set in New Mexico
Cultural depictions of Billy the Kid
Cultural depictions of Pat Garrett
Films scored by William Lava
Films directed by Joseph Kane
1930s English-language films
1930s American films